Zabrus chiosanus is a species of ground beetle in the Pelor subgenus that is endemic to the North Aegean islands.

References

Beetles described in 1889
Endemic fauna of North Aegean islands
Zabrus
Chios